The 1954 Philadelphia Phillies season was a season in Major League Baseball. The Phillies finished fourth in the National League with a record of 75 wins and 79 losses.

Offseason 
 December 1, 1953: 1953 minor league draft
Lee Tate was drafted by the Phillies from the Lubbock Hubbers.
Lee Tate was drafted from the Phillies by the New York Giants.
John Anderson was drafted from the Phillies by the New York Giants.
 Prior to 1954 season: John Anderson was returned to the Phillies by the Giants.

Regular season 
The Phillies and Philadelphia Athletics played their last Philadelphia City Series game against each other on June 28, 1954, in the seventh annual Junior Baseball Federation of Philadelphia benefit exhibition game. The Phillies beat the Athletics 3 to 2 in 7 innings in front of 15,993 fans.

Season standings

Record vs. opponents

Game log

|- style="background:#fbb"
| 1 || April 13 || @ Pirates || 2–4 || Vern Law (1–0) || Robin Roberts (0–1) || Johnny Hetki (1) || 32,294 || 0–1
|- style="background:#bfb"
| 2 || April 14 || @ Pirates || 6–0 || Curt Simmons (1–0) || Paul LaPalme (0–1) || None || 5,853 || 1–1
|- style="background:#bfb"
| 3 || April 15 || Giants || 2–0 (7) || Murry Dickson (1–0) || Johnny Antonelli (0–1) || None || 15,345 || 2–1
|- style="background:#bbb"
| – || April 17 || Pirates || colspan=6 | Postponed (rain); Makeup: July 7 as a traditional double-header
|- style="background:#bfb"
| 4 || April 18 (1) || Pirates || 6–0 || Robin Roberts (1–1) || Bob Friend (0–1) || None || see 2nd game || 3–1
|- style="background:#bfb"
| 5 || April 18 (2) || Pirates || 7–1 || Curt Simmons (2–0) || Vern Law (1–1) || None || 9,975 || 4–1
|- style="background:#fbb"
| 6 || April 19 || Dodgers || 7–9 || Johnny Podres (1–0) || Jim Konstanty (0–1) || None || 31,294 || 4–2
|- style="background:#bfb"
| 7 || April 20 || Dodgers || 6–3 || Murry Dickson (2–0) || Preacher Roe (0–1) || None || 21,921 || 5–2
|- style="background:#fbb"
| 8 || April 21 || @ Dodgers || 3–6 || Billy Loes (1–0) || Steve Ridzik (0–1) || Jim Hughes (2) || 27,724 || 5–3
|- style="background:#bbb"
| – || April 23 || @ Giants || colspan=6 | Postponed (rain, wet grounds); Makeup: April 25 as a traditional double-header
|- style="background:#fbb"
| 9 || April 24 || @ Giants || 0–1 || Marv Grissom (1–0) || Robin Roberts (1–2) || None || 6,865 || 5–4
|- style="background:#fbb"
| 10 || April 25 (1) || @ Giants || 0–3 || Sal Maglie (3–0) || Curt Simmons (2–1) || None || see 2nd game || 5–5
|- style="background:#fbb"
| 11 || April 25 (2) || @ Giants || 0–5 || Johnny Antonelli (2–1) || Murry Dickson (2–1) || None || 22,778 || 5–6
|- style="background:#bbb"
| – || April 27 || @ Cubs || colspan=6 | Postponed (rain, wet grounds); Makeup: June 9 as a double-header
|- style="background:#bbb"
| – || April 28 || @ Cubs || colspan=6 | Postponed (rain); Makeup: July 23 as a double-header
|- style="background:#bfb"
| 12 || April 29 || @ Braves || 4–0 || Robin Roberts (2–2) || Warren Spahn (2–1) || None || 18,793 || 6–6
|- style="background:#bfb"
| 13 || April 30 || @ Braves || 5–2 || Murry Dickson (3–1) || Gene Conley (0–1) || Jim Konstanty (1) || 20,433 || 7–6
|-

|- style="background:#bfb"
| 14 || May 1 || @ Braves || 4–3 (10) || Curt Simmons (3–1) || Dave Jolly (2–1) || None || 20,784 || 8–6
|- style="background:#bfb"
| 15 || May 2 (1) || @ Redlegs || 4–3 || Bob Miller (1–0) || Howie Judson (1–2) || None || 17,663 || 9–6
|- style="background:#bbb"
| – || May 2 (2) || @ Redlegs || colspan=6 | Postponed (rain, wet grounds); Makeup: July 15 as a traditional double-header
|- style="background:#bfb"
| 16 || May 4 || @ Cardinals || 14–10 (11) || Murry Dickson (4–1) || Cot Deal (0–2) || None || 8,009 || 10–6
|- style="background:#bfb"
| 17 || May 5 || @ Cardinals || 10–3 || Robin Roberts (3–2) || Tom Poholsky (0–1) || None || 8,422 || 11–6
|- style="background:#bbb"
| – || May 6 || @ Cardinals || colspan=6 | Postponed (rain); Makeup: July 18 as a traditional double-header
|- style="background:#fbb"
| 18 || May 7 || Dodgers || 1–3 || Don Newcombe (3–1) || Curt Simmons (3–2) || None || 14,743 || 11–7
|- style="background:#fbb"
| 19 || May 8 || Dodgers || 0–3 (6) || Johnny Podres (3–0) || Murry Dickson (4–2) || None || 12,364 || 11–8
|- style="background:#fbb"
| 20 || May 9 || Dodgers || 1–2 || Carl Erskine (3–2) || Robin Roberts (3–3) || Jim Hughes (4) || 13,818 || 11–9
|- style="background:#bfb"
| 21 || May 11 || Cubs || 8–7 (10) || Steve Ridzik (1–1) || Turk Lown (0–1) || None || 4,329 || 12–9
|- style="background:#bfb"
| 22 || May 12 || Cubs || 5–4 || Curt Simmons (4–2) || Warren Hacker (1–2) || None || 4,407 || 13–9
|- style="background:#bfb"
| 23 || May 13 || Redlegs || 8–1 || Robin Roberts (4–3) || Corky Valentine (3–3) || None || 6,856 || 14–9
|- style="background:#fbb"
| 24 || May 14 || Redlegs || 0–1 || Art Fowler (2–0) || Murry Dickson (4–3) || None || 7,114 || 14–10
|- style="background:#bfb"
| 25 || May 15 || Redlegs || 5–4 || Jim Konstanty (1–1) || Jackie Collum (1–1) || None || 3,981 || 15–10
|- style="background:#fbb"
| 26 || May 16 (1) || Cardinals || 3–7 || Harvey Haddix (5–3) || Jim Konstanty (1–2) || Al Brazle (4) || see 2nd game || 15–11
|- style="background:#bfb"
| 27 || May 16 (2) || Cardinals || 8–4 || Paul Penson (1–0) || Carl Scheib (0–2) || Murry Dickson (1) || 24,495 || 16–11
|- style="background:#fbb"
| 28 || May 17 || Cardinals || 0–8 || Joe Presko (3–0) || Robin Roberts (4–4) || None || 13,776 || 16–12
|- style="background:#fbb"
| 29 || May 18 || Braves || 2–6 || Chet Nichols (3–3) || Curt Simmons (4–3) || Dave Jolly (1) || 9,254 || 16–13
|- style="background:#fbb"
| 30 || May 19 || Braves || 2–6 || Warren Spahn (4–3) || Murry Dickson (4–4) || None || 9,910 || 16–14
|- style="background:#bbb"
| – || May 20 || Giants || colspan=6 | Postponed (rain); Makeup: September 7
|- style="background:#bfb"
| 31 || May 21 || Giants || 8–1 || Robin Roberts (5–4) || Johnny Antonelli (5–2) || None || 7,021 || 17–14
|- style="background:#fbb"
| 32 || May 22 || Giants || 0–5 || Rubén Gómez (2–3) || Paul Penson (1–1) || None || 12,183 || 17–15
|- style="background:#fbb"
| 33 || May 23 || Giants || 4–6 || Jim Hearn (1–3) || Curt Simmons (4–4) || Marv Grissom (3) || 9,688 || 17–16
|- style="background:#fbb"
| 34 || May 24 || Giants || 4–5 || Hoyt Wilhelm (2–1) || Murry Dickson (4–5) || None || 7,899 || 17–17
|- style="background:#bbb"
| – || May 25 || @ Dodgers || colspan=6 | Postponed (rain, threatening weather); Makeup: August 16
|- style="background:#bfb"
| 35 || May 26 || @ Dodgers || 8–6 || Robin Roberts (6–4) || Johnny Podres (4–1) || None || 17,097 || 18–17
|- style="background:#bfb"
| 36 || May 27 || @ Dodgers || 11–5 || Bob Miller (2–0) || Don Newcombe (3–3) || None || 3,183 || 19–17
|- style="background:#bfb"
| 37 || May 28 || @ Pirates || 4–0 (6) || Murry Dickson (5–5) || Max Surkont (4–5) || None || 5,521 || 20–17
|- style="background:#fbb"
| 38 || May 29 || @ Pirates || 2–3 || George O'Donnell (2–4) || Steve Ridzik (1–2) || None || 2,525 || 20–18
|- style="background:#bfb"
| 39 || May 30 (1) || @ Pirates || 8–0 || Robin Roberts (7–4) || Dick Littlefield (0–1) || None || 2,525 || 21–18
|- style="background:#bfb"
| 40 || May 30 (2) || @ Pirates || 10–7 || Karl Drews (1–0) || Bob Friend (1–5) || Jim Konstanty (2) || 9,651 || 22–18
|- style="background:#fbb"
| 41 || May 31 || Dodgers || 4–5 (12) || Clem Labine (2–2) || Bob Miller (2–1) || None || 22,386 || 22–19
|-

|- style="background:#bfb"
| 42 || June 2 || @ Redlegs || 23–19 || Curt Simmons (5–4) || Art Fowler (4–1) || None || 8,509 || 23–19
|- style="background:#bbb"
| – || June 3 || @ Redlegs || colspan=6 | Postponed (rain, wet grounds); Makeup: July 16 as a traditional double-header
|- style="background:#fbb"
| 43 || June 4 || @ Cardinals || 2–5 || Harvey Haddix (8–3) || Robin Roberts (7–5) || None || 11,789 || 23–20
|- style="background:#bfb"
| 44 || June 5 || @ Cardinals || 9–4 || Murry Dickson (6–5) || Vic Raschi (5–1) || None || 14,519 || 24–20
|- style="background:#bfb"
| 45 || June 6 || @ Cardinals || 11–8 || Bob Miller (3–1) || Royce Lint (1–2) || None || 18,547 || 25–20
|- style="background:#fbb"
| 46 || June 8 || @ Cubs || 5–6 || Howie Pollet (3–2) || Robin Roberts (7–6) || Johnny Klippstein (1) || 6,775 || 25–21
|- style="background:#bfb"
| 47 || June 9 (1) || @ Cubs || 4–0 || Murry Dickson (7–5) || Bob Rush (4–5) || None || 34,268 || 26–21
|- style="background:#bfb"
| 48 || June 9 (2) || @ Cubs || 14–6 || Bob Miller (4–1) || Jim Davis (1–2) || Jim Konstanty (3) || 11,238 || 27–21
|- style="background:#bfb"
| 49 || June 10 || @ Cubs || 6–0 || Jim Konstanty (2–2) || Paul Minner (5–3) || None || 4,926 || 28–21
|- style="background:#fbb"
| 50 || June 11 || @ Braves || 0–1 || Lew Burdette (6–5) || Curt Simmons (5–5) || None || 35,047 || 28–22
|- style="background:#fbb"
| 51 || June 12 || @ Braves || 0–2 || Jim Wilson (2–0) || Robin Roberts (7–7) || None || 28,218 || 28–23
|- style="background:#fbb"
| 52 || June 13 || @ Braves || 5–9 || Warren Spahn (7–5) || Murry Dickson (7–6) || None || 39,859 || 28–24
|- style="background:#fbb"
| 53 || June 15 || Cardinals || 1–3 || Vic Raschi (6–2) || Bob Miller (4–2) || None || 10,684 || 28–25
|- style="background:#bbb"
| – || June 16 || Cardinals || colspan=6 | Postponed (wet grounds); Makeup: July 31 as a traditional double-header
|- style="background:#bfb"
| 54 || June 17 || Cardinals || 3–2 (15) || Robin Roberts (8–7) || Joe Presko (3–6) || None || 12,881 || 29–25
|- style="background:#fbb"
| 55 || June 18 || Redlegs || 1–2 || Corky Valentine (6–5) || Curt Simmons (5–6) || Frank Smith (9) || 8,589 || 29–26
|- style="background:#fbb"
| 56 || June 19 || Redlegs || 6–7 || Jackie Collum (4–1) || Murry Dickson (7–7) || Frank Smith (10) || 4,257 || 29–27
|- style="background:#fbb"
| 57 || June 20 (1) || Redlegs || 3–4 || Fred Baczewski (5–3) || Bob Miller (4–3) || None || see 2nd game || 29–28
|- style="background:#fbb"
| 58 || June 20 (2) || Redlegs || 6–15 || Art Fowler (5–3) || Herm Wehmeier (0–4) || None || 14,832 || 29–29
|- style="background:#bfb"
| 59 || June 22 || Cubs || 4–1 || Robin Roberts (9–7) || Paul Minner (5–4) || None || 8,128 || 30–29
|- style="background:#bfb"
| 60 || June 23 || Cubs || 5–3 || Curt Simmons (6–6) || Howie Pollet (3–4) || None || 6,927 || 31–29
|- style="background:#bfb"
| 61 || June 24 || Cubs || 3–2 (11) || Herm Wehmeier (1–4) || Paul Minner (5–5) || None || 6,060 || 32–29
|- style="background:#fbb"
| 62 || June 25 || Braves || 0–7 || Lew Burdette (7–7) || Bob Miller (4–4) || None || 16,560 || 32–30
|- style="background:#bfb"
| 63 || June 26 || Braves || 10–3 || Robin Roberts (10–7) || Chet Nichols (4–6) || None || 5,373 || 33–30
|- style="background:#bfb"
| 64 || June 27 (1) || Braves || 4–3 || Curt Simmons (7–6) || Dave Jolly (4–3) || None || 5,373 || 34–30
|- style="background:#bfb"
| 65 || June 27 (2) || Braves || 2–1 || Steve Ridzik (2–2) || Warren Spahn (7–8) || None || 19,073 || 35–30
|- style="background:#bfb"
| 66 || June 29 || @ Pirates || 4–0 || Herm Wehmeier (2–4) || Max Surkont (6–9) || None || 5,088 || 36–30
|- style="background:#bfb"
| 67 || June 30 || @ Pirates || 8–0 || Robin Roberts (11–7) || Vern Law (6–9) || None || 4,209 || 37–30
|-

|- style="background:#bfb"
| 68 || July 2 || Dodgers || 7–6 || Steve Ridzik (3–2) || Clem Labine (4–4) || Robin Roberts (1) || 21,929 || 38–30
|- style="background:#fbb"
| 69 || July 3 || Dodgers || 3–4 || Bob Milliken (5–0) || Bob Miller (4–5) || None || 8,980 || 38–31
|- style="background:#fbb"
| 70 || July 4 || Dodgers || 3–5 (10) || Carl Erskine (9–7) || Robin Roberts (11–8) || None || 15,420 || 38–32
|- style="background:#fbb"
| 71 || July 5 (1) || @ Giants || 0–10 || Johnny Antonelli (12–2) || Herm Wehmeier (2–5) || None || see 2nd game || 38–33
|- style="background:#fbb"
| 72 || July 5 (2) || @ Giants || 3–4 || Hoyt Wilhelm (8–2) || Murry Dickson (7–8) || None || 36,547 || 38–34
|- style="background:#bfb"
| 73 || July 6 || Pirates || 3–0 || Curt Simmons (8–6) || Bob Friend (3–7) || None || 3,967 || 39–34
|- style="background:#bbb"
| – || July 7 (1) || Pirates || colspan=6 | Postponed (rain); Makeup: August 13 as a double-header
|- style="background:#bbb"
| – || July 7 (2) || Pirates || colspan=6 | Postponed (rain); Makeup: September 21 as a double-header
|- style="background:#fbb"
| 74 || July 9 || @ Dodgers || 5–7 (10) || Erv Palica (3–1) || Murry Dickson (7–9) || None || 13,586 || 39–35
|- style="background:#fbb"
| 75 || July 10 || @ Dodgers || 5–10 || Billy Loes (4–3) || Bob Miller (4–6) || None || 11,047 || 39–36
|- style="background:#fbb"
| 76 || July 11 (1) || @ Dodgers || 7–8 || Carl Erskine (10–8) || Jim Konstanty (2–3) || Jim Hughes (15) || 11,047 || 39–37
|- style="background:#bfb"
| 77 || July 11 (2) || @ Dodgers || 3–1 || Herm Wehmeier (3–5) || Don Newcombe (5–5) || Robin Roberts (2) || 23,973 || 40–37
|- style="background:#bbcaff;"
| – || July 13 ||colspan="7" |1954 Major League Baseball All-Star Game at Cleveland Stadium in Cleveland
|- style="background:#fbb"
| 78 || July 15 (1) || @ Redlegs || 1–2 || Art Fowler (7–5) || Curt Simmons (8–7) || None || see 2nd game || 40–38
|- style="background:#fbb"
| 79 || July 15 (2) || @ Redlegs || 3–4 || Jackie Collum (6–1) || Bob Miller (4–7) || Howie Judson (2) || 12,232 || 40–39
|- style="background:#fbb"
| 80 || July 16 (1) || @ Redlegs || 6–7 (10) || Frank Smith (4–1) || Steve Ridzik (3–3) || None || see 2nd game || 40–40
|- style="background:#fbb"
| 81 || July 16 (2) || @ Redlegs || 4–9 || Joe Nuxhall (4–2) || Herm Wehmeier (3–6) || None || 28,878 || 40–41
|- style="background:#bfb"
| 82 || July 17 || @ Redlegs || 5–3 || Bob Miller (5–7) || Moe Savransky (0–1) || None || 4,859 || 41–41
|- style="background:#bfb"
| 83 || July 18 (1) || @ Cardinals || 11–10 (10) || Robin Roberts (12–8) || Brooks Lawrence (4–3) || Curt Simmons (1) || 18,958 || 42–41
|- style="background:#fea"
| 84 || July 18 (2) || @ Cardinals || 0–0 (0) || None || None || None || see 1st game || 43–41
|- style="background:#fbb"
| 85 || July 19 || @ Cardinals || 1–5 || Brooks Lawrence (5–3) || Bob Greenwood (0–1) || None || 8,488 || 43–42
|- style="background:#fbb"
| 86 || July 20 || @ Cardinals || 2–4 || Harvey Haddix (14–6) || Curt Simmons (8–8) || Gerry Staley (3) || 8,829 || 43–43
|- style="background:#bfb"
| 87 || July 21 || @ Braves || 6–1 || Robin Roberts (13–8) || Gene Conley (8–5) || None || 36,799 || 44–43
|- style="background:#fbb"
| 88 || July 22 || @ Braves || 2–3 || Lew Burdette (8–11) || Murry Dickson (7–10) || None || 23,146 || 44–44
|- style="background:#fbb"
| 89 || July 23 (1) || @ Cubs || 2–5 || Howie Pollet (5–5) || Herm Wehmeier (3–7) || None || 16,438 || 44–45
|- style="background:#bfb"
| 90 || July 23 (2) || @ Cubs || 5–3 (13) || Robin Roberts (14–8) || Bill Tremel (1–1) || None || 8,563 || 45–45
|- style="background:#fbb"
| 91 || July 24 || @ Cubs || 0–4 || Dave Cole (1–2) || Curt Simmons (8–9) || None || 10,246 || 45–46
|- style="background:#fbb"
| 92 || July 25 (1) || @ Cubs || 1–6 || Paul Minner (9–6) || Steve Ridzik (3–4) || None || 10,246 || 45–47
|- style="background:#fbb"
| 93 || July 25 (2) || @ Cubs || 1–2 || Jim Davis (7–2) || Bob Greenwood (0–2) || None || 23,353 || 45–48
|- style="background:#bfb"
| 94 || July 27 || Redlegs || 8–2 || Robin Roberts (15–8) || Bud Podbielan (6–5) || None || 11,415 || 46–48
|- style="background:#bfb"
| 95 || July 28 || Redlegs || 3–2 || Herm Wehmeier (4–7) || Frank Smith (4–3) || None || 6,463 || 47–48
|- style="background:#fbb"
| 96 || July 29 || Redlegs || 0–3 || Corky Valentine (8–9) || Murry Dickson (7–11) || None || 5,408 || 47–49
|- style="background:#fbb"
| 97 || July 30 || Cardinals || 3–12 || Harvey Haddix (15–7) || Bob Miller (5–8) || None || 12,194 || 47–50
|- style="background:#fbb"
| 98 || July 31 (1) || Cardinals || 2–3 || Brooks Lawrence (8–3) || Robin Roberts (15–9) || Harvey Haddix (3) || see 2nd game || 47–51
|- style="background:#bfb"
| 99 || July 31 (2) || Cardinals || 6–5 || Bob Greenwood (1–2) || Royce Lint (2–3) || Murry Dickson (2) || 27,204 || 48–51
|-

|- style="background:#bfb"
| 100 || August 1 || Cardinals || 8–3 || Curt Simmons (9–9) || Ralph Beard (0–2) || None || 5,707 || 49–51
|- style="background:#fbb"
| 101 || August 3 || Braves || 1–3 || Warren Spahn (11–10) || Murry Dickson (7–12) || None || 13,899 || 49–52
|- style="background:#bfb"
| 102 || August 4 || Braves || 2–1 || Robin Roberts (16–9) || Chet Nichols (7–8) || None || 16,093 || 50–52
|- style="background:#bbb"
| – || August 5 || Braves || colspan=6 | Postponed (rain); Makeup: September 12 as a double-header
|- style="background:#bfb"
| 103 || August 6 || Cubs || 7–4 || Curt Simmons (10–9) || Howie Pollet (6–6) || None || 7,060 || 51–52
|- style="background:#bfb"
| 104 || August 7 || Cubs || 8–2 || Bob Miller (6–8) || Dave Cole (2–4) || Murry Dickson (3) || 3,807 || 52–52
|- style="background:#bfb"
| 105 || August 8 (1) || Cubs || 8–4 || Robin Roberts (17–9) || Hal Jeffcoat (3–4) || None || 3,807 || 53–52
|- style="background:#bfb"
| 106 || August 8 (2) || Cubs || 8–3 || Herm Wehmeier (5–7) || Bob Rush (7–13) || None || 10,400 || 54–52
|- style="background:#bfb"
| 107 || August 10 || Dodgers || 6–3 || Curt Simmons (11–9) || Johnny Podres (7–5) || Robin Roberts (3) || 31,421 || 55–52
|- style="background:#fbb"
| 108 || August 11 || Dodgers || 2–3 || Billy Loes (7–3) || Murry Dickson (7–13) || None || 24,536 || 55–53
|- style="background:#fbb"
| 109 || August 13 (1) || Pirates || 5–9 || Bob Friend (5–10) || Robin Roberts (17–10) || None || 24,536 || 55–54
|- style="background:#fbb"
| 110 || August 13 (2) || Pirates || 0–5 || Jake Thies (2–3) || Herm Wehmeier (5–8) || None || 8,804 || 55–55
|- style="background:#fbb"
| 111 || August 14 || Pirates || 4–8 || Vern Law (8–12) || Curt Simmons (11–10) || None || 2,865 || 55–56
|- style="background:#fbb"
| 112 || August 15 (1) || Pirates || 6–9 || Dick Littlefield (8–6) || Murry Dickson (7–14) || Johnny Hetki (8) || 2,865 || 55–57
|- style="background:#bfb"
| 113 || August 15 (2) || Pirates || 7–6 || Robin Roberts (18–10) || Johnny Hetki (3–3) || None || 4,773 || 56–57
|- style="background:#bfb"
| 114 || August 16 || @ Dodgers || 9–6 || Robin Roberts (19–10) || Clem Labine (5–5) || None || 15,814 || 57–57
|- style="background:#fbb"
| 115 || August 17 || @ Giants || 3–8 || Johnny Antonelli (18–3) || Curt Simmons (11–11) || None || 15,688 || 57–58
|- style="background:#fbb"
| 116 || August 18 || @ Giants || 2–6 || Sal Maglie (12–6) || Herm Wehmeier (5–9) || None || 9,992 || 57–59
|- style="background:#fbb"
| 117 || August 19 || @ Giants || 0–5 || Rubén Gómez (11–8) || Murry Dickson (7–15) || None || 6,530 || 57–60
|- style="background:#fbb"
| 118 || August 20 || @ Dodgers || 4–6 || Billy Loes (9–3) || Robin Roberts (19–11) || Clem Labine (3) || 15,057 || 57–61
|- style="background:#bbb"
| – || August 21 || @ Dodgers || colspan=6 | Postponed (rain); Makeup: August 22 as a double-header
|- style="background:#bfb"
| 119 || August 22 (1) || @ Dodgers || 6–2 || Herm Wehmeier (6–9) || Carl Erskine (16–11) || None || 15,057 || 58–61
|- style="background:#bfb"
| 120 || August 22 (2) || @ Dodgers || 6–0 || Murry Dickson (8–15) || Russ Meyer (9–5) || None || 26,349 || 59–61
|- style="background:#fbb"
| 121 || August 24 || @ Braves || 1–5 || Warren Spahn (15–10) || Robin Roberts (19–12) || None || 37,749 || 59–62
|- style="background:#fbb"
| 122 || August 25 || @ Braves || 3–4 || Lew Burdette (12–11) || Curt Simmons (11–12) || Dave Jolly (9) || 30,689 || 59–63
|- style="background:#fbb"
| 123 || August 26 || @ Braves || 2–3 || Ernie Johnson (3–1) || Herm Wehmeier (6–10) || None || 24,863 || 59–64
|- style="background:#fbb"
| 124 || August 27 || @ Cubs || 3–4 (12) || Jim Davis (8–5) || Murry Dickson (8–16) || None || 5,790 || 59–65
|- style="background:#fbb"
| 125 || August 28 || @ Cubs || 2–5 || Dave Cole (3–5) || Steve Ridzik (3–5) || Warren Hacker (3) || 9,350 || 59–66
|- style="background:#fbb"
| 126 || August 29 (1) || @ Redlegs || 2–3 || Art Fowler (11–8) || Robin Roberts (19–13) || None || 2,995 || 59–67
|- style="background:#fbb"
| 127 || August 29 (2) || @ Redlegs || 4–8 || Fred Baczewski (6–6) || Bob Miller (6–9) || Frank Smith (19) || 14,006 || 59–68
|- style="background:#fbb"
| 128 || August 30 || @ Redlegs || 1–5 || Jackie Collum (7–2) || Curt Simmons (11–13) || None || 5,392 || 59–69
|- style="background:#bfb"
| 129 || August 31 || @ Redlegs || 9–3 || Herm Wehmeier (7–10) || Bud Podbielan (7–8) || None || 2,636 || 60–69
|-

|- style="background:#bfb"
| 130 || September 1 || @ Cardinals || 5–2 || Murry Dickson (9–16) || Brooks Lawrence (11–6) || None || 7,287 || 61–69
|- style="background:#bfb"
| 131 || September 2 || @ Cardinals || 5–4 || Robin Roberts (20–13) || Harvey Haddix (15–11) || None || 4,343 || 62–69
|- style="background:#bfb"
| 132 || September 3 (1) || @ Pirates || 7–1 || Curt Simmons (12–13) || Bob Friend (5–11) || None || 10,790 || 63–69
|- style="background:#bfb"
| 133 || September 3 (2) || @ Pirates || 10–2 || Steve Ridzik (4–5) || Dick Littlefield (9–9) || None || 5,302 || 64–69
|- style="background:#bfb"
| 134 || September 5 || @ Pirates || 12–5 || Herm Wehmeier (8–10) || Laurin Pepper (1–3) || None || 4,645 || 65–69
|- style="background:#fbb"
| 135 || September 6 (1) || Giants || 4–8 || Don Liddle (7–3) || Murry Dickson (9–17) || Marv Grissom (16) || see 2nd game || 65–70
|- style="background:#bfb"
| 136 || September 6 (2) || Giants || 5–4 (11) || Robin Roberts (21–13) || Al Worthington (0–2) || None || 35,272 || 66–70
|- style="background:#fbb"
| 137 || September 7 || Giants || 1–3 (11) || Rubén Gómez (14–9) || Curt Simmons (12–14) || Hoyt Wilhelm (7) || 13,535 || 66–71
|- style="background:#fbb"
| 138 || September 8 || Redlegs || 3–9 || Frank Smith (5–7) || Murry Dickson (9–18) || None || 3,913 || 66–72
|- style="background:#bbb"
| – || September 10 || Cubs || colspan=6 | Postponed (rain); Makeup: September 11 as a double-header
|- style="background:#bfb"
| 139 || September 11 (1) || Cubs || 3–0 || Herm Wehmeier (9–10) || Jim Davis (10–7) || None || 3,913 || 67–72
|- style="background:#bfb"
| 140 || September 11 (2) || Cubs || 8–2 || Bob Miller (7–9) || Howie Pollet (8–9) || None || 1,642 || 68–72
|- style="background:#bfb"
| 141 || September 12 (1) || Braves || 5–2 || Murry Dickson (10–18) || Warren Spahn (19–11) || None || 3,913 || 69–72
|- style="background:#fbb"
| 142 || September 12 (2) || Braves || 1–2 || Lew Burdette (14–12) || Robin Roberts (21–14) || None || 17,598 || 69–73
|- style="background:#fbb"
| 143 || September 13 || Braves || 4–7 || Dave Jolly (9–6) || Curt Simmons (12–15) || None || 11,189 || 69–74
|- style="background:#fbb"
| 144 || September 14 || Cardinals || 2–5 || Brooks Lawrence (13–6) || Ron Mrozinski (0–1) || None || 5,157 || 69–75
|- style="background:#fbb"
| 145 || September 15 || Cardinals || 1–3 || Tom Poholsky (4–6) || Herm Wehmeier (9–11) || None || 1,997 || 69–76
|- style="background:#bfb"
| 146 || September 17 || @ Giants || 4–3 || Robin Roberts (22–14) || Johnny Antonelli (21–6) || None || 11,540 || 70–76
|- style="background:#fbb"
| 147 || September 18 || @ Giants || 1–9 || Don Liddle (8–4) || Murry Dickson (10–19) || Marv Grissom (17) || 7,988 || 70–77
|- style="background:#bbb"
| – || September 19 || @ Giants || colspan=6 | Postponed (rain); Makeup: September 24 as a traditional double-header in Philadelphia
|- style="background:#bbb"
| – || September 21 (1) || Pirates || colspan=6 | Postponed (rain); Makeup: September 22 as a double-header
|- style="background:#bbb"
| – || September 21 (2) || Pirates || colspan=6 | Postponed (rain); Makeup: September 23
|- style="background:#bfb"
| 148 || September 22 (1) || Pirates || 12–1 || Curt Simmons (13–15) || Laurin Pepper (1–5) || None || 5,157 || 71–77
|- style="background:#bfb"
| 149 || September 22 (2) || Pirates || 5–1 || Robin Roberts (23–14) || Dick Littlefield (10–11) || None || 2,837 || 72–77
|- style="background:#bfb"
| 150 || September 23 || Pirates || 4–2 || Herm Wehmeier (10–11) || Paul LaPalme (4–10) || None || 936 || 73–77
|- style="background:#fbb"
| 151 || September 24 (1) || Giants || 0–1 || Don Liddle (9–4) || Murry Dickson (10–20) || None || see 2nd game || 73–78
|- style="background:#bfb"
| 152 || September 24 (2) || Giants || 4–2 || Ron Mrozinski (1–1) || Windy McCall (2–4) || Robin Roberts (4) || 12,165 || 74–78
|- style="background:#bfb"
| 153 || September 25 || Giants || 2–1 (11) || Curt Simmons (14–15) || Windy McCall (2–5) || None || 6,310 || 75–78
|- style="background:#fbb"
| 154 || September 26 || Giants || 2–3 (11) || George Spencer (1–0) || Robin Roberts (23–15) || None || 7,992 || 75–79
|-

| style="text-align:left;" |
The second game on May 16 was suspended (Sunday curfew) at the end of the sixth inning with the score 6–3 and was completed May 17, 1954.
The second game on July 18, 1954, was forfeited in favor of the Phillies. Contemporary newspaper accounts indicate a 9–0 final score as a result of the forfeiture, but Baseball Reference indicates a 0–0 score and Phillies victory.
The second game on August 15 was suspended (Sunday curfew) at the end of the eighth inning with the score 6–6 and was ultimately completed September 23, 1954 (after being attempted on September 21 and 22).

Roster

Player stats

Batting

Starters by position 
Note: Pos = Position; G = Games played; AB = At bats; H = Hits; Avg. = Batting average; HR = Home runs; RBI = Runs batted in

Other batters 
Note: G = Games played; AB = At bats; H = Hits; Avg. = Batting average; HR = Home runs; RBI = Runs batted in

Pitching

Starting pitchers 
Note: G = Games pitched; IP = Innings pitched; W = Wins; L = Losses; ERA = Earned run average; SO = Strikeouts

Other pitchers 
Note: G = Games pitched; IP = Innings pitched; W = Wins; L = Losses; ERA = Earned run average; SO = Strikeouts

Relief pitchers 
Note: G = Games pitched; W = Wins; L = Losses; SV = Saves; ERA = Earned run average; SO = Strikeouts

Farm system

References

External links 
1954 Philadelphia Phillies season at Baseball Reference

Philadelphia Phillies seasons
Philadelphia Phillies season
Philadelphia